The Stade Larbi Benbarek, originally known as Stade Philip, is a multi-purpose stadium in Casablanca, Morocco. It is mostly used mostly for football matches and it hosted the home matches of Wydad Casablanca of the Botola until the Stade Mohamed V opened. The stadium has a capacity of 20,000 spectators.  It is named after Larbi Benbarek.

References

External links
Stadium website

Football venues in Morocco
Multi-purpose stadiums in Morocco
Sports venues in Casablanca